Steven Ken Tsujiura (born February 28, 1962) is a Canadian-born Japanese former professional ice hockey centre who played in the American Hockey League (AHL), the Swiss National League A (NLA) and the Japan Ice Hockey League (JIHL). He played in the 1998 Winter Olympics for host country Japan. He was selected by the Philadelphia Flyers in the 10th round (205th overall) of the 1981 NHL Entry Draft.

Awards and honours
AHL Fred T. Hunt Memorial Award (1985–86)
WHL Most Sportsmanlike Player (1979–80 & 1980–81)
WHL Player of the Year (1980–81)
 WHL Second All-Star Team (1980-81)

Career statistics

Regular season and playoffs

International

External links
 

1962 births
People from Lethbridge County
Calgary Wranglers (WHL) players
Canadian ice hockey centres
Canadian sportspeople of Japanese descent
EHC Bülach players
HC Davos players
HC Gardena players
HC Lugano players
Ice hockey people from Alberta
Ice hockey players at the 1998 Winter Olympics
Japanese ice hockey players
Kokudo Keikaku players
Naturalized citizens of Japan
Living people
Maine Mariners players
Medicine Hat Tigers players
Olympic ice hockey players of Japan
Philadelphia Flyers draft picks
Springfield Indians players
Utica Devils players
New England Stingers players
Canadian expatriate ice hockey players in Switzerland